The men's 400 metres freestyle at the 2018 World Para Swimming European Championships was held at the National Aquatic Centre in Dublin from 13 to 19 August.  8 classification finals are held in all over this event.

Medalists

See also
List of IPC world records in swimming

References

400 metres freestyle